Slumberland Furniture, Inc. is a family-owned furniture retailer in the Midwestern United States, founded in 1967.

History 
Slumberland Furniture is headquartered in Oakdale, MN.

Originally, the company specialized in mattresses and La-Z-Boy recliners. Today, Slumberland has 123 stores in 12 states. It is one of America's top sellers of La-Z-Boy upholstery and one of the top sellers of Sealy in the Midwest.

References

 
  
  
  
  
  
  
   
  
 "Slumberland donates 40 mattress sets to MICA". Times-Republican. Retrieved March 26, 2016.

External links
Slumberland web page

Companies based in Minnesota
Retail companies established in 1967
Furniture retailers of the United States
1967 establishments in Minnesota